Laiwu District is one of 10 urban districts of the prefecture-level city of Jinan, the capital of Shandong Province, East China.

Nevertheless, its built-up area made of Laiwu District and Gangcheng District (the previous Laiwu city) was home to 1,298,529 inhabitants.

In January 2019, the Shandong provincial government announced in a decision that Laiwu Prefecture-level City was absorbed by Jinan. Laicheng District was renamed to Laiwu District under Jinan's administration.

Administrative divisions
As 2012, Laicheng District is divided to 4 subdistricts, 10 towns and 1 townships.
Subdistricts

Towns

Townships
Hezhuang Township

Climate

Notable villages 
 Beishanyang

References

External links 
 Official homepage 
 Information page

County-level divisions of Shandong
Jinan